The 1984 Prague Skate was held November 1984. It was the 20th edition. Medals were awarded in the disciplines of men's singles, ladies' singles, pair skating and ice dancing.

Men

Ladies

Pairs

Ice dancing

References

Prague Skate
Prague Skate